The Bolivian big-eared mouse (Auliscomys boliviensis) is a species of rodent in the family Muridae. It is found in Bolivia, Chile, and Peru.

References

Mammals of Bolivia
Mammals of Chile
Mammals of Peru
Auliscomys
Mammals described in 1846
Taxonomy articles created by Polbot